Danzig is a German-language surname. Notable people with the surname include:

 Avraham Danzig (1748–1820), rabbi, author of works on Jewish law
 Glenn Danzig (born 1955), American rock vocalist, songwriter, and publisher
 Jerome Alan Danzig (1913–2001). American reporter, news producer, and political adviser
 Mac Danzig (born 1980), American professional mixed martial arts practitioner
 Richard Danzig (born 1944), American lawyer and former Secretary of the Navy

See also
Dantzig (surname)

German-language surnames